Pūanu Glacier is a glacier that occupies the upper portion of Papitashvili Valley in the Apocalypse Peaks of Victoria Land.  Pūanu is a Māori word, meaning "intense cold", and was applied descriptively to this glacier in 2005 by the New Zealand Geographic Board.

References

Glaciers of Victoria Land